Ronnie del Carmen (born December 31, 1959) is a Filipino animation writer, director, story artist, story supervisor and production designer. He co-directed and was one of the story writers for the 2015 Pixar film Inside Out, for which he was nominated for an Academy Award for Best Original Screenplay.  He was the story supervisor on Pixar's tenth full-length computer-animated film, Up and directed its accompanying short film, Dug's Special Mission.

Early life and education
Del Carmen was born in the city of Cavite in the Philippines. After high school, he worked as a painter on the set of Francis Ford Coppola's 1979 film Apocalypse Now, which was filming in the Philippines. He graduated from the University of Santo Tomas with a Bachelor of Fine Arts in Advertising.

Career

Film
After college, Del Carmen worked as an art director for print and television advertising campaigns before moving to the United States in 1989 to pursue a career in film. He worked for Warner Bros as a storyboard artist on Batman: The Animated Series, and as a story supervisor for DreamWorks on The Prince of Egypt (1998), The Road to El Dorado (2000), Spirit: Stallion of the Cimarron (2002) and Sinbad: Legend of the Seven Seas (2003). He joined Pixar Animation Studios in 2000, working as story supervisor on Finding Nemo (2003), production designer on the Academy Award-nominated short film One Man Band (2005), storyboard artist on Ratatouille (2007) and WALL-E (2008), and story supervisor on Up (2009). He made his directorial debut with the animated short film Dug's Special Mission (2009), which accompanied Up on its DVD and Blu-ray release. He co-directed the computer-animated Inside Out with Pete Docter. The film premiered at the 68th Cannes Film Festival on May 18, 2015. In April 2021, it was revealed that Del Carmen had left Pixar and is set to write and direct an original Philippine-themed animated feature film at Netflix.

Comic books
Del Carmen has illustrated several comic books, including Batman Adventures: Holiday Special, which won an Eisner Award for Best Single Issue in 1995, and the children's book My Name Is Dug, written by Kiki Thorpe. He has also written several comic books, including the Paper Biscuit series and And There You Are.

Personal life
Del Carmen is married and has two children. His brothers, Louie and Rick, also work in animation.

Filmography

Feature films

Short films

Television

Bibliography
 Fragments (Fragments Filigree Factory Production, 2003), illustrator
 Paper Biscuit (Half Life, 2003), writer, illustrator
 Paper Biscuit One Point Five (2003), writer, illustrator
 Batman: Black and White, Vol. 2 (DC Comics, 2003), illustrator
 Paper Biscuit 2 (2004), writer, illustrator
 Project: Superior (AdHouse Books, 2005), illustrator
 Three Trees Make a Forest (Gingko Press, 2006), illustrator
 My Name is Dug (Disney Press, 2009), illustrator
 And There You Are (AdHouse Books, 2009), writer, illustrator

Awards and nominations
 Eisner Award, Best Single Issue, Batman Adventures Holiday Special (with Paul Dini and Bruce Timm), 1995
 Daytime Emmy Award Outstanding Special Class Animated Program: Director, Freakazoid, 1996
 Annie Award, Storyboarding in an Animated Feature Production, Spirit: Stallion of the Cimarron, 2003
 Annie Award Nomination, Storyboarding in an Animated Feature Production, WALL-E, 2009
 Annie Award Nomination, Storyboarding in an Animated Feature Production, Up, 2010
 National Cartoonists Society, Animated Feature Division Award, Up, 2010
 Academy Award for Best Original Screenplay Nomination, Inside Out (with Pete Docter, Meg LeFauve and Josh Cooley), 2015

References

External links

 
 

1959 births
Living people
Annie Award winners
Filipino animators
Pixar people
Filipino storyboard artists
Filipino comics artists
Artists from Cavite
People from Cavite City
University of Santo Tomas alumni